Anaka Alankamony (born 10 July 1994) is an Indian squash player. She held a career-high world ranking of 59 in 2010 and won the coveted Arjuna Award in 2014.

Education 
She was a student of Sri Sivasubramaniya Nadar College of Engineering and a former student of Sacred Heart Matriculation Higher Secondary School Chennai.

Anaka enrolled at the University of Pennsylvania in Philadelphia in the fall of 2013. At University of Pennsylvania, she plays on the women's squash team and studies Computer Science and Economics in the College of Arts and Sciences. However, her studies in the United States have been touted as a reason for her low participation in tournaments and slipping rank in the World Squash Rankings.

Career 
Anaka's first big win was at the Asian U-15 circuit at just 13 years of age. She then set the world record at the age of 15 as the youngest person in the world to earn the WISPA title in 2009. Malaysia's Nicol David had earlier won the title at the age of 16. Anaka was the second Indian, after Joshna Chinappa to win the WISPA title. She won the same title for the second time in 2012.

She was awarded the Young Achiever Award by Rotary Club of Madras Northwest.

In 2008, she was crowned the Asian Junior Squash Individual Champion in 2008 in Korea.

Anaka won a bronze medal (team) at the 2010 Asian Games, Guangzhou and a Silver medal (team) at the 2014 Asian Games, Incheon.

Anaka won The Arjuna Award 2014 for her achievements in squash, as the government also felt that it was important to promote women squash players. However, this Award was mired in controversy after senior squash players from the country felt that she had not yet done enough in the professional circuit to deserve the award, especially because her rank had slipped from her career high 59 in 2009 to 151 in 2014.

Anaka has receded from the professional circuit.

References

External links
 
 

1994 births
Living people
Indian female squash players
Penn Quakers women's squash players
Asian Games medalists in squash
Asian Games silver medalists for India
Asian Games bronze medalists for India
Squash players at the 2010 Asian Games
Squash players at the 2014 Asian Games
Medalists at the 2010 Asian Games
Medalists at the 2014 Asian Games
Racket sportspeople from Chennai
Sportswomen from Tamil Nadu
Recipients of the Arjuna Award